Alou may refer to:

People

Given name
Alou Diarra (born 1981), French footballer
Alou Kuol (born 2001), Australian footballer
Alou Traoré (born 1874), Malian footballer

Surname
Antoinette Tidjani Alou, Jamaican-Nigerien academic and writer
Felipe Alou (born 1935), Dominican baseball player and manager, brother of Matty and Jesús
Jesús Alou (1942–2023), Dominican outfielder, brother of Felipe and Matty
Matty Alou (1938–2011), Dominican outfielder, brother of Felipe and Jesús
Moisés Alou (born 1966), American outfielder, son of Felipe
Oussama Alou (born 2002), Dutch footballer

Others
Alou, Cameroon, town and commune in Cameroon

See also
 
 
 Aloo (disambiguation)
 Alu (disambiguation)

Spanish-language surnames